Kalateh-ye Torkha (also Romanized as Kalāteh-ye Torkhā) is a village in Darband Rural District, Jolgeh Sankhvast District, Jajrom County, North Khorasan Province, Iran. At the 2006 census, its population was 318, in 71 families.

References 

Populated places in Jajrom County